Route 666: America's Scariest Home Haunts is a non-fiction internet television series shown on Comcast's FEARnet website.
Each webisode "highlights one of the country’s most innovative home haunts and uncovers the secrets behind the 'scares.'"
The series is hosted by Danielle Harris, star of Halloween 4, Halloween 5 and Rob Zombie's remake of the original Halloween.
The program is produced by NY-based Atlas Media Corporation. The executive producer is Bruce David Klein.

References

External links
 Atlas carries content to YouTube, others
 FEARnet Rolls Out Their Halloween Programming
 Article in The Oregonian about FEARnet and Route 666: America's Scariest Home Haunts

American non-fiction web series